Arthropteris tenella is a rainforest fern of the genus Arthropteris native to eastern Australia and New Zealand.

It is found in shady areas on rocks or on trees. The specific epithet tenella is from the Latin, meaning "delicate".

References

Tectariaceae
Ferns of Australia
Ferns of New Zealand
Flora of New South Wales
Flora of Lord Howe Island
Flora of Norfolk Island
Flora of Queensland